Daniel Lee Yan-Kong is a Hong Kong film director, screenwriter, assistant director, and art director.

Filmography

Director
 What Price Survival (1994)
 Black Mask (1996)
 ...Till Death Do Us Part (1998)
 Moonlight Express (1999)
 A Fighter's Blues (2000)
 Star Runner (2003)
 Dragon Squad (2005)
 Three Kingdoms: Resurrection of the Dragon (2008)
 14 Blades (2010)
 White Vengeance (2011)
 Dragon Blade (2015)
 Time Raiders (2016)
 The Climbers (2019)

Writer
 What Price Survival (1994)
 Till Death Do Us Part (1998)
 Moonlight Express (1999)
 A Fighter's Blues (2000) (co-writer and story by)
 Star Runner (2003) (co-writer)
 Dragon Squad (2005) (co-writer)
 Three Kingdoms: Resurrection of the Dragon (2008) (co-writer)
 Dragon Blade (2015)

Art director
 Starry Is the Night (1988)
 The Revenge of Angel (1990)
 Bury Me High (1991)
 The Prince of Temple Street (1992)
 Lady Supercop (1993)
 What Price Survival (1994)
 Lover's Tears (1996)

Assistant director
 ''Princess Fragrance (1987)

References

External links

 
 Daniel Lee @HKMDB.com
 LoveHKFilm.com
 HK Cinemagic.com

Hong Kong art directors
Hong Kong film directors
Hong Kong screenwriters
Living people
1960 births